This is a list of television and radio stations along with a list of media outlets in and around Constanța, Romania including Constanța County.

TV stations

The cable providers in Constanța are RCS&RDS and UPC.

Radio stations

Constanța stations

Other stations
Numerous radio stations outside Constanţa are also licensed to broadcast in the Constanța area.

Print

Newspapers and magazines
 Constanța 100% - CT100.ro 
 CTnews / Constanța NEWS - ctnews.ro 
 GoNEXT - gonext.ro 
 Constanta Financiara 
 Cuget Liber 
 Constanta.ro - realitatea urbană de zi cu zi.
 Adolescentul
 Litoral
 Atac de Constanța
 Jurnalul de Constanța
 Replica de Constanța
 Ziua de Constanța
 Bună ziua Constanța
 Presa din Constanța - index presa

Book publishers

Other

References

External links
Radio and TV stations in Constanța
FMscan

Constanța
Constanța County